Kozlovka is a rural locality (a selo) in Bogoslovsky Selsoviet of Mazanovsky District, Amur Oblast, Russia. The population was 73 as of 2018. There is 1 street.

Geography 
Kozlovka is located on the left bank of the Selemdzha River, 33 km northeast of Novokiyevsky Uval (the district's administrative centre) by road. Bogoslovka is the nearest rural locality.

References 

Rural localities in Mazanovsky District